Dieudonné Kabongo (1950 – October 11, 2011) was a Congolese-born Belgian comedian, humorist, musician, and actor. Kabongo co-starred in the 2000 film, Lumumba, portraying Godefroid Munongo. He was the first comedian of African descent to achieve widespread popularity in Belgium.

Biography 
Kabongo was born in 1950 in Katanga, Belgian Congo, which is now the Democratic Republic of Congo. He immigrated to Belgium in 1970. He originally studied electromechanical engineering in Virton, Belgium, before embarking on a self-apprenticeship in theater and writing.

In 1984, Kabongo and fellow actor Mirko Popovitch jointly won the First Prize at the Festival International du Rire de Rochefort. His film credits included Identity Pieces in 1998, the 2000 film Lumumba, directed by Raoul Peck, and the 2005 film, Le Couperet, directed by Costa-Gavras. He was awarded the lifetime achievement award by the Africa Filmfestival in 2010. For his role in The Invader, he received a Magritte Award nomination for Best Supporting Actor.

Kabongo collapsed and died during a performance on stage at a cultural center in Jette, a district of Brussels, on October 11, 2011, at the age of 61.

References

External links

1950 births
2011 deaths
20th-century Belgian male actors
Belgian male film actors
Belgian male comedians
Democratic Republic of the Congo emigrants to Belgium
People from Katanga Province
Deaths onstage
21st-century Belgian musicians
20th-century Belgian musicians